Hurting may refer to:

Pain
The Hurting, 1983 debut album by Tears for Fears
The Hurting (TV series), a British television clip show
"Hurting" (song), 2010 single by Karl Wolf, featuring Sway